Carroll County is located in the U.S. state of Maryland. As of the 2020 census, the population was 172,891. Its county seat is Westminster.

Carroll County is included in the Baltimore-Columbia-Towson, MD Metropolitan Statistical Area, which is also included in the Washington-Baltimore-Arlington, DC-MD-VA-WV-PA Combined Statistical Area. While predominantly rural, the county has become increasingly suburban in recent years.

History
Prior to European colonization, the land that now makes up Carroll County was inhabited by Native Americans for thousands of years. Numerous Native American archaeological sites and archeological artifacts have been located across the county. Native Americans used the land for permanent settlements, seasonal visits and journeys, and as hunting grounds. At the time of European colonization, the Susquehannock and the Lenape were the predominant indigenous nations in the area. What is now the city of Manchester was inhabited by the Susquehannock nation until around 1750 and was the location of the intersection of two important Native American trails. An ancient trail that was used by Algonquian and Iroquois nations, named the "Patapsco-Conewago (Hanover) Road" by colonists, stretched from the Susquehanna River to the Potomac River. Main Street in Westminster was built over a portion of the trail between the two rivers. By the end of the 1700s, most roads in Carroll County were trails established by Native Americans. Maryland Route 26 (Liberty Road) was built over top what was originally a Native American trail. This trail passed through the Freedom area of southern Carroll County and was used by Native Americans to travel from the Blue Ridge Mountains to the Chesapeake Bay. The trail was transformed into a road and renamed "Liberty" by an act of the Maryland General Assembly in the early 1800s. The land of what is now Sykesville was used by the Susquehannock and the Lenape as hunting grounds. Taneytown was inhabited by the Tuscarora people during the early to mid-1700s. The Tuscarora hunted deer, wolves, wildcats, and otters in the woodlands of what is now Taneytown. Due to the Six Nations land cessions, the Tuscarora were expelled westward across the South Mountain of the Cumberland Valley.
 
Carroll County was created in 1837 from parts of Baltimore and Frederick Counties, see Hundred (division). It was named for Charles Carroll of Carrollton (1737–1832), signer of the American Declaration of Independence.

The earliest European settlers in Carroll County were predominantly Pennsylvania Dutch from southeast Pennsylvania and English from the Tidewater region of Maryland. German was the predominant language of Carroll County until the Civil War. German was most heavily spoken in the northern and western parts of the county. The towns of Hampstead, Manchester, and Taneytown had German majorities. English-speakers were a minority and were concentrated in southern Carroll.

During the American Civil War, the population of Carroll County was sharply divided between supporters of the Union and the Confederacy.  In 1863, there were significant troop movements through the county as part of the Gettysburg campaign. On June 29, 1863, the cavalry skirmish known as Corbit's Charge was fought in the streets of Westminster, when two companies of Delaware cavalry attacked a much larger Confederate force under General J.E.B. Stuart.

During the 1970s, Carroll County was a stronghold of the Ku Klux Klan and the Klan regularly held rallies and cross-burnings. The KKK held rallies and handed out leaflets on Main Street in Westminster and in Manchester until the late 1980s.  In 2012, two minors were charged for a cross-burning in Westminster. In 2018, the KKK distributed fliers in southern Carroll County.

In 2013 the Carroll County Board of Commissioners voted to make English the official language of the county. In 2018, the Carroll County Public Schools announced that Confederate flags and Nazi swastikas would be banned from Carroll County schools, along with Ku Klux Klan and Aryan Nation symbolism and other messages that promote hatred or intolerance.

Geography

Topographically, Carroll County is located within the Piedmont Plateau region, with characteristic upland terrain of rolling hills and deciduous forest. The most prominent relief is Parr's Ridge, which bisects the county from southwest to northeast. The highest point is an unnamed  hilltop a half-mile south of the Pennsylvania state line in the northeastern part of the county off Harvey Yingling Road.

Carroll County is bordered on the north by the Mason–Dixon line with Pennsylvania, and on the south by Howard County across the South Branch of the Patapsco River.  About half of the eastern border, with Baltimore County, is formed by the North Branch of the Patapsco River and by Liberty Reservoir, though the northern half near Manchester and Hampstead is a land border.  Carroll County is bordered on the west by Frederick County, across the Monocacy River and Sam's Creek. Other major streams in the county include Big Pipe Creek, Little Pipe Creek, and Double Pipe Creek, Bear Branch, and the headwaters of the Gunpowder Falls. The Piney Run Reservoir is in the southern part of the county.

Three railroad lines cross Carroll County. The old Baltimore and Ohio (B&O) Old Main Line crosses the southern part of the county from east to west, with former stations in Sykesville and Mount Airy. The original Western Maryland Railway (WM) main line track runs southeast to northwest through Carrollton, Westminster, New Windsor, and Union Bridge. The old Baltimore and Hanover Railroad (later acquired by WM) runs further to the east through Hampstead, Millers, and Lineboro. Two of these railroad lines are now operated by CSX Transportation; the former WM main line is now operated by Maryland Midland Railway.

Carroll County has two water reservoirs at present, Liberty and Piney Run; the county has also proposed a Union Mills Reservoir and Gillis Falls Reservoir.

Climate
The county is divided by the January freezing isotherm into a humid subtropical climate (Cfa) and a hot-summer humid continental climate (Dfa.) The hardiness zones are 6b and 7a.

Adjacent counties
York County, Pennsylvania (northeast)
Baltimore County (east)
Howard County (south)
Frederick County (west)
Adams County, Pennsylvania (northwest)
Montgomery County (southwest)

Demographics

2020 census

Note: the US Census treats Hispanic/Latino as an ethnic category. This table excludes Latinos from the racial categories and assigns them to a separate category. Hispanics/Latinos can be of any race.

2010 census
As of the 2010 United States Census, there were 167,134 people, 59,786 households, and 45,163 families residing in the county. The racial makeup of the county was 92.9% white, 3.2% black or African American, 1.4% Asian, 0.2% American Indian, 0.7% from other races, and 1.5% from two or more races. Those of Hispanic or Latino origin made up 2.6% of the population. In terms of ancestry, 33.8% were German, 19.1% were Irish, 14.0% were English, 8.4% were American, 8.2% were Italian, 5.3% were Polish, 2.8% were French and 2.3% were Scottish.

Of the 59,786 households, 37.2% had children under the age of 18 living with them, 62.8% were married couples living together, 8.6% had a female householder with no husband present, 24.5% were non-families, and 20.0% of all households were made up of individuals. The average household size was 2.74 and the average family size was 3.15. The median age was 41.1 years.

The median income for a household in the county was $81,621 and the median income for a family was $95,825. Males had a median income of $62,322 versus $46,170 for females. The per capita income for the county was $33,938. About 4.0% of families and 5.3% of the population were below the poverty line, including 6.6% of those under age 18 and 6.0% of those age 65 or over.

2000 census
As of the census of 2000, there were 150,897 people, 52,503 households, and 41,109 families residing in the county.  The population density was 336 people per square mile (130/km2).  There were 54,260 housing units at an average density of 121 per square mile (47/km2).  The racial makeup of the county was 95.69% White, 2.28% Black or African American, 0.22% Native American, 0.75% Asian, 0.02% Pacific Islander, 0.31% from other races, and 0.73% from two or more races.  0.99% of the population were Hispanic or Latino of any race. 30.5% were of German, 14.0% Irish, 11.1% United States or American, 10.7% English and 7.3% Italian ancestry.

There were 52,503 households, out of which 39.70% had children under the age of 18 living with them, 66.50% were married couples living together, 8.30% had a female householder with no husband present, and 21.70% were non-families. 17.50% of all households were made up of individuals, and 7.40% had someone living alone who was 65 years of age or older.  The average household size was 2.81 and the average family size was 3.18.

In the county, the population was spread out, with 27.70% under the age of 18, 7.00% from 18 to 24, 30.60% from 25 to 44, 23.90% from 45 to 64, and 10.80% who were 65 years of age or older.  The median age was 37 years. For every 100 females there were 97.40 males.  For every 100 females age 18 and over, there were 94.00 males.

The median income for a household in the county was $60,021, and the median income for a family was $66,430 (these figures had risen to $78,912 and $90,376 respectively as of a 2007 estimate). Males had a median income of $44,191 versus $30,599 for females. The per capita income for the county was $23,829.  About 2.70% of families and 3.80% of the population were below the poverty line, including 4.00% of those under age 18 and 4.90% of those age 65 or over.

As of 2007, Carroll County was the tenth wealthiest county in the country in its population range of 65,000 to 250,000

As of the 2010 census the population was 167,134.  The racial makeup was 91.20% Non-Hispanic whites, 3.19% blacks, 0.20% Native Americans, 1.45% Asians, 0.03% Pacific Islanders, 0.09% Non-Hispanics of some other race, 1.33% Non-Hispanics reporting two or more races and 2.61% Hispanics.

Economy
JoS. A. Bank Clothiers has its headquarters in an unincorporated area in the county, near Hampstead.

Carroll County Public Schools is the largest employer in Carroll County.

Top employers
According to the county's comprehensive annual financial reports, the top employers by number of employees in the county are the following. ("NR" indicates the employer was not ranked among the top ten employers that year.)

Politics and government
Carroll County differs from most counties in the Baltimore-Washington area in that it is strongly Republican. No Democratic presidential candidate has carried Carroll County since Lyndon Johnson's 1964 landslide, and even LBJ won by a mere 119 votes out of 16,783 cast in that election; none have even won 40% of the county's vote. Since World War I ended, the only other Democrat to carry Carroll County has been Franklin D. Roosevelt, who managed to achieve this only during his initial 1932 campaign. Before World War I Carroll County had considerable Confederate sympathy and hence leaned Democratic,  although it did vote twice for William McKinley.

In the 2012 presidential election, 65 percent of the county's vote went for Republican candidate Mitt Romney. In Maryland's 2014 gubernatorial race, Carroll County voted for Republican Larry Hogan over Democrat Lieutenant Governor Anthony Brown by sixty-six percentage points (82  to 16 percent).

Carroll County is governed by five county commissioners, a “commission” being the traditional form of county government in Maryland.

Several times in the past, Carroll County voters have rejected charter amendments that would call for a government consisting of a County Executive and a County Council.

|}

Commissioners
In 2004 Carroll County voters approved legislation that expanded the number of County Commissioners from three to five. The five Commissioners are elected from five Commissioner districts, as opposed to three Commissioners elected at-large. The change occurred with the 2010 elections, since the Maryland General Assembly did not agree on the districts in time for the 2006 elections.

Commissioners elected in 2022—all Republican—were:
 Joe Vigliotti, Commissioner, District 1
 Kenneth Kiler, Commissioner, District 2
 Tom Gordon III, Commissioner, District 3
 Michael R. Guerin, Commissioner, District 4
 Ed Rothstein, Commissioner, District 5, President

Cabinet
Supporting the commissioners is a cabinet, composed of the following departments:
 Administrative Services
 Citizen Services (Celene Steckel, Director)
 Comptroller (Rob Burk, Comptroller)
 County Attorney (Timothy C. Burke, County Attorney)
 Economic Development (Jack Lyburn, Director)
 Fire & Emergency Medical Services (Michael Robinson, Director/Fire & EMS Chief)
 Land & Resource Management (Chris Heyn, Director)
 Management and Budget (Ted Zaleski, Director)
 Office of Public Safety Support Services (Scott R. Campbell, Administrator)
 Public Works (Jeffrey Castonguay, Director)

Sheriff
The current elected Sheriff is James T. DeWees. The longest served Carroll County sheriff was LeRoy Campbell.

Federal
The current elected U.S. Representatives are Democrats Dutch Ruppersberger of the 2nd District and John Sarbanes of the 3rd District.

Transportation

Major highways

Bus
Carroll County operates its own bus public transit system, known as the Carroll Transit System. After 40 years of service, the Carroll Area Transit System (CATS bus) ended its transportation services in the county at the end of July, 2016. CATS was replaced by the Carroll Transit System, which is operated by Ride With Us. Carroll Transit Service offers five fixed-deviated routes that were previously operated by CATS, as well as demand-response, door-to-door service.

The Owings Mills station of the Baltimore Metro SubwayLink in nearby Owings Mills, Baltimore County, is a short drive by car from Carroll County and provides subway access to downtown Baltimore. Due to longstanding opposition to mass transit from local residents and politicians, there is no inter-county bus or rail transit linking Carroll County to nearby suburban communities of Baltimore County. Due to a resolution passed by the Carroll County Board of Commissioners, the Carroll Transit System is prohibited from offering bus services into or out of the county. The Baltimore Sun editorial board has condemned Carroll County's "transit phobia" and excoriated the mass transit resolution as "thinly veiled racist provocation." The Baltimore City Paper declared the resolution "racist" and suggested adding toll booths for cars entering Baltimore County from Carroll County.

Education
The Carroll County Public Schools School system is the ninth largest school district in the state of Maryland.

McDaniel College, a small private liberal arts college, is located in Westminster.

Carroll Community College is a two-year community college serving the residents of Carroll County. It is located in Westminster, Maryland.

Media
The newspaper of record is the Carroll County Times.
Carroll County has one AM radio station, WTTR, located in Westminster.

Infrastructure

Law enforcement
Law enforcement services for the county are provided by the Carroll County Sheriff's Office, Maryland State Police, as well as several municipalities having their own police forces.  In addition to providing police services, the Sheriff's Office also acts as an agent of the courts:  serving warrants, enforcing child support laws, ensuring courthouse security, transporting prisoners, etc.  On October 4, 2007, the County Commissioners voted to create a police department for the county. The police department would handle primary law enforcement duties while the Sheriff's office would continue to act under the arm of the courts. This move would give the Commissioners power to appoint or fire the chief of police instead of having a popularly elected Sheriff being in charge of all law enforcement.  This move falls in line with Maryland's more populated counties who have such a dual system of law enforcement (Montgomery, Anne Arundel, Prince George's, Howard and Baltimore Counties), as Carroll County has begun to have a population increase.  Municipal departments, such as Westminster Police, would be unaffected by the change.

Family support services

Communities
This county contains the following incorporated municipalities:

Cities
Westminster (county seat)
Taneytown

Towns
Manchester
Mount Airy
New Windsor
Union Bridge
Hampstead
Sykesville

Census-designated place
Eldersburg

Unincorporated communities

Alesia
Carrollton
Carrolltowne
Detour
Finksburg
Frizzelburg
Gamber
Gaither
Greenmount
Harney
Henryton
Jasontown
Keymar
Lineboro
Linwood
Louisville
Marriottsville (partly in Howard County and Baltimore County)
Mayberry
Middleburg
Millers
Patapsco
Pleasant Valley
Silver Run
Union Mills
Uniontown
Woodbine (partly in Howard County.)
Woodstock (partly in Howard County.)

Notable people
 Francis Scott Key, author of "The Star-Spangled Banner", was born at his family plantation of Terra Rubra, in what is now northwestern Carroll County
 Whittaker Chambers, former communist spy, testified against Alger Hiss
 Isaac Roop, first elected (provisional) governor of the newly proposed Nevada Territory; born in Carroll County
 Kyle Snyder, Olympic, World, NCAA wrestling champion
 Band Half Japanese was founded in Uniontown, Maryland by Jad and David Fair.

See also

National Register of Historic Places listings in Carroll County, Maryland

References

External links

Carroll County, Maryland Genealogy and History
Carroll County Government
Carroll County Public Schools
Carroll County Times
Carroll County Today - Carroll County, MD News, Weather, More
Carroll County Public Library
Corbit's Charge
Carroll County Business Directory
City-Data.com Comprehensive Statistical Data and more about Carroll County

 
1837 establishments in Maryland
Populated places established in 1837
Maryland counties